Leuchars railway station serves the towns of Leuchars and St Andrews in Fife, Scotland. The station is the last northbound stop before Dundee.

The station was built as Leuchars Junction station for the route over the Tay Bridge to Dundee, the previous Leuchars station being on the line to Tayport.

There are buses and taxis available to transfer passengers to nearby St. Andrews, which does not have its own railway station; integrated tickets with the destination "St Andrews Bus" are sold.

The station is located near Leuchars Station, a British Army installation, formerly RAF Leuchars airbase.

Previous station operator First ScotRail announced plans during March 2008 to erect a wind turbine to meet the electricity requirements of the station, and hope to generate a small surplus of electricity which they can sell back to the National Grid. Leuchars will be the first station to be powered this way, and if the project, which was funded by Transport Scotland proves successful, it may be rolled out across other stations.

History 
It became the junction for St Andrews on 1 July 1852. It was closed  to passengers when Leuchars Junction opened on 1 June 1878 but reopened as "Leuchars (old)" six months later. It finally closed to passengers on 3 October 1921 and to goods on 6 November 1967.

Leuchars Junction opened on the current site, just south of the junction for the Tay Bridge, on 1 June 1878. It consisted of an island platform with a south facing bay for branch line trains for St Andrews, and a north facing bay for trains on the old main line to Tayport.

On 30 June 1913, the station buildings at Leuchars Junction burnt to the ground. This was widely believed to be arson by suffragettes.
The current buildings are those of the 1913 rebuilding. After the closure of the Tayport line in 1967 and the St Andrews branch on 6 January 1969 the station ceased to be a junction and the two bays were filled in. The station was subsequently renamed "Leuchars (for St Andrews)".

Services 
Weekday timetable

Intercity trains

London North Eastern Railway

Caledonian Sleeper:

Local trains

ScotRail:

2 tph to Edinburgh.

See also
St Andrews rail link

References

Railway stations in Fife
Former North British Railway stations
Railway stations in Great Britain opened in 1878
Railway stations served by ScotRail
Railway stations served by Caledonian Sleeper
Railway stations served by London North Eastern Railway
1878 establishments in Scotland